Hornostaivka is a village in Henichesk Raion, Kherson Oblast, southern Ukraine. Hornostaivka belongs to the Novotroitske settlement hromada, one of the hromadas of Ukraine. The village had a population of 603.

Administrative status 
Until 18 July, 2020, Hornostaivka belonged to Novotroitske Raion. The raion was abolished in July 2020 as part of the administrative reform of Ukraine, which reduced the number of raions of Kherson Oblast to five. The area of Novotroitske Raion was merged into Henichesk Raion.

References

External links
 Hornostaivka at the Verkhovna Rada of Ukraine site

Villages in Henichesk Raion